Fergus Nicoll is a British author and former BBC World Service radio presenter.

Early life 
Brought up as a Roman Catholic, Nicoll was educated at Ampleforth College, Christ Church, Oxford (BA Oriental Studies) and Reading University, where he graduated PhD with a thesis entitled "Gladstone, Gordon and Sudan, 1883-5".

Career
After working as a teacher in northern Sudan, he began his career with the BBC in 1988 with the African Service. He moved to the BBC's Cairo Bureau in 1992 and spent three years (1996-9) as a World Affairs Correspondent, filing for the World Service and BBC World TV.  In 1999-2000, he was Press Officer for Olara Otunnu, Special Representative of the UN Secretary General for Children and Armed Conflict. From 2001-12, he was a freelance presenter on the BBC World Service radio programme The World Today. From August 2012-July 2013 he was Public Relations and Publications Manager at the Rift Valley Institute. From April–June 2012, Dr Nicoll was the 2013 Sir William Luce Fellow at Durham University, where he carried out research on the Da'irat al-Mahdi in Sudan. From September 2013 to August 2014 he worked in Doha, Qatar, as a Programme Editor and Executive Producer for Al Jazeera English. From 2014 to May 2022 he was based in London as a presenter on the BBC World Service radio programmes Business Matters and World Business Report.

Writing
In 2004, Nicoll published a biography of the Mahdi of Sudan, The Sword of the Prophet: The Mahdi of Sudan and the Death of General Gordon. His second book, a biography of the Mughal Emperor Shah Jahan, was published by Haus Publishing in April 2009 as Shah Jahan: The Rise and Fall of the Mughal Emperor.  Penguin-India (under the Viking imprint) published the same volume in September 2009. Returning to Sudan studies, Nicoll published An Index to the Complete Works of al-Imam al-Mahdi in June 2009.  The Abd-al-Karim Mirghani Cultural Centre in Omdurman followed this with the publication of an Arabic translation of The Mahdi of Sudan in October 2009, under the title Seif al-Nabi: Mahdi al-Sudan. In September 2010, the Qasim Data Centre in Khartoum published Nicoll's Bibliography of the Mahdia.  In April 2013, Pen & Sword published his reappraisal of British policy in Sudan: Gladstone, Gordon and the Sudan Wars, 1883-5: The Battle over Imperial Intervention in the Victorian Age. In July 2013, Durham University published his Luce Lecture as 'Da'irat al-Mahdi: Money, Faith and Politics in Sudan'. In late 2014, the Modestine Press in Milton Keynes published the first in a series of annotated editions of important primary sources relating to the Sudan wars: A Cool, Equable Judgement: The Sudan Journal of Lt.-Col. J. Donald Hamill-Stewart. Nicoll's most recent peer-reviewed article is 'Fatwa and Propaganda: Contemporary Muslim Responses to the Sudanese Mahdiyya', published in Islamic Africa 7/2 (2016): 239-65. In 2017, the Modestine Press published the follow-up to the Stewart journal: A Perfect Pandemonium: The Khartoum Journal of Major-General Charles Gordon. This is currently being translated into Arabic, again for the Abd-al-Karim Mirghani Cultural Centre. In 2018, Modestine produced Nicoll's third volume of primary sources: Fully Equal to the Occasion: Frank Power and the Siege of Khartoum.

Awards
 Sony Award for "Best Breakfast Show" (1991)
 Sony Award for "Best News & Current Affairs Programme" (The World Today) (2009)
 Association for International Broadcasting Award for "Clearest live news coverage - radio" (2012) for coverage of South Sudan’s independence for BBC World Service

References

External links
 Fergus Nicoll at Penguin India

Alumni of Christ Church, Oxford
Alumni of the University of Reading
BBC newsreaders and journalists
BBC World News
BBC World Service people
Living people
People educated at Ampleforth College
Year of birth missing (living people)